This page lists all described genera and species of the spider family Corinnidae. , the World Spider Catalog accepts 872 species in 68 genera:

A

Abapeba

Abapeba Bonaldo, 2000
 Abapeba abalosi (Mello-Leitão, 1942) — Paraguay, Argentina
 Abapeba brevis (Taczanowski, 1874) — French Guiana
 Abapeba cayana (Taczanowski, 1874) — French Guiana
 Abapeba cleonei (Petrunkevitch, 1926) — St. Thomas
 Abapeba echinus (Simon, 1896) — Brazil
 Abapeba grassima (Chickering, 1972) — Panama
 Abapeba guanicae (Petrunkevitch, 1930) — Puerto Rico
 Abapeba hirta (Taczanowski, 1874) — French Guiana
 Abapeba hoeferi Bonaldo, 2000 — Brazil
 Abapeba kochi (Petrunkevitch, 1911) — South America
 Abapeba lacertosa (Simon, 1898) (type) — St. Vincent, Trinidad, northern South America
 Abapeba luctuosa (F. O. Pickard-Cambridge, 1899) — Mexico
 Abapeba lugubris (Schenkel, 1953) — Venezuela
 Abapeba pennata (Caporiacco, 1947) — Guyana
 Abapeba rioclaro Bonaldo, 2000 — Brazil
 Abapeba rufipes (Taczanowski, 1874) — French Guiana
 Abapeba saga (F. O. Pickard-Cambridge, 1899) — Mexico
 Abapeba sicarioides (Mello-Leitão, 1935) — Brazil
 Abapeba taruma Bonaldo, 2000 — Brazil
 Abapeba wheeleri (Petrunkevitch, 1930) — Puerto Rico

Aetius

Aetius O. Pickard-Cambridge, 1897
 Aetius decollatus O. Pickard-Cambridge, 1897 (type) — India, Sri Lanka
 Aetius nocturnus Deeleman-Reinhold, 2001 — Thailand, Indonesia (Borneo)
 Aetius tuberculatus (Haddad, 2013) — Ivory Coast

Allomedmassa

Allomedmassa Dankittipakul & Singtripop, 2014
 Allomedmassa bifurca Jin, H. Zhang & F. Zhang, 2019 — China
 Allomedmassa crassa Jin, H. Zhang & F. Zhang, 2019 — China
 Allomedmassa deelemanae Dankittipakul & Singtripop, 2014 — Malaysia (Borneo)
 Allomedmassa mae Dankittipakul & Singtripop, 2014 (type) — Thailand, China
 Allomedmassa matertera Jin, H. Zhang & F. Zhang, 2019 — China

Apochinomma

Apochinomma Pavesi, 1881
 Apochinomma acanthaspis Simon, 1896 — Brazil
 Apochinomma armatum Mello-Leitão, 1922 — Brazil
 Apochinomma bilineatum Mello-Leitão, 1939 — Brazil
 Apochinomma constrictum Simon, 1896 — Brazil
 Apochinomma dacetonoides Mello-Leitão, 1948 — Guyana
 Apochinomma decepta Haddad, 2013 — Mozambique, South Africa
 Apochinomma dolosum Simon, 1897 — India
 Apochinomma elongata Haddad, 2013 — Tanzania, Malawi, Botswana
 Apochinomma formica Simon, 1896 — Brazil
 Apochinomma formicaeforme Pavesi, 1881 (type) — West, Central, East, Southern Africa
 Apochinomma formicoides Mello-Leitão, 1939 — Brazil
 Apochinomma malkini Haddad, 2013 — Nigeria
 Apochinomma myrmecioides Mello-Leitão, 1922 — Brazil
 Apochinomma nitidum (Thorell, 1895) — India, Myanmar, Thailand, Indonesia (Borneo, Sulawesi)
 Apochinomma parva Haddad, 2013 — Guinea
 Apochinomma pyriforme (Keyserling, 1891) — Brazil

Arushina

Arushina Caporiacco, 1947
 Arushina dentichelis Caporiacco, 1947 (type) — Tanzania

Attacobius

Attacobius Mello-Leitão, 1925
 Attacobius attarum (Roewer, 1935) — Brazil
 Attacobius blakei Bonaldo & Brescovit, 2005 — Brazil
 Attacobius carimbo Pereira-Filho, Saturnino & Bonaldo, 2018 — Brazil
 Attacobius carranca Bonaldo & Brescovit, 2005 — Brazil
 Attacobius demiguise Pereira-Filho, Saturnino & Bonaldo, 2018 — Brazil
 Attacobius kitae Bonaldo & Brescovit, 2005 — Brazil
 Attacobius lamellatus Bonaldo & Brescovit, 2005 — Brazil
 Attacobius lauricae Pereira-Filho, Saturnino & Bonaldo, 2018 — Brazil
 Attacobius lavape Bonaldo, Pesquero & Brescovit, 2018 — Brazil
 Attacobius luederwaldti (Mello-Leitão, 1923) (type) — Brazil
 Attacobius nigripes (Mello-Leitão, 1942) — Argentina
 Attacobius thalitae Pereira-Filho, Saturnino & Bonaldo, 2018 — Brazil
 Attacobius tremembe Pereira-Filho, Saturnino & Bonaldo, 2018 — Brazil
 Attacobius tucurui Bonaldo & Brescovit, 2005 — Brazil
 Attacobius uiriri Bonaldo & Brescovit, 2005 — Brazil
 Attacobius verhaaghi Bonaldo & Brescovit, 1998 — Brazil

Austrophaea

Austrophaea Lawrence, 1952
 Austrophaea zebra Lawrence, 1952 (type) — South Africa

B

Battalus

Battalus Karsch, 1878
 Battalus adamparsonsi Raven, 2015 — Australia (Queensland, New South Wales, Victoria)
 Battalus baehrae Raven, 2015 — Australia (South Australia)
 Battalus bidgemia Raven, 2015 — Australia (Western Australia, Queensland)
 Battalus boolathana Raven, 2015 — Australia (Western Australia)
 Battalus byrneae Raven, 2015 — Australia (Tasmania)
 Battalus diadens Raven, 2015 — Australia (Queensland, New South Wales, Victoria)
 Battalus helenstarkae Raven, 2015 — Australia (South Australia)
 Battalus microspinosus Raven, 2015 — Australia (Western Australia, South Australia)
 Battalus rugosus Raven, 2015 — Australia (Western Australia, South Australia)
 Battalus semiflavus (Simon, 1896) — Australia (Queensland)
 Battalus spinipes Karsch, 1878 (type) — Australia (Queensland)
 Battalus wallum Raven, 2015 — Australia (Queensland, New South Wales)
 Battalus zuytdorp Raven, 2015 — Australia (Western Australia)

Brachyphaea

Brachyphaea Simon, 1895
 Brachyphaea berlandi Lessert, 1915 — East Africa
 Brachyphaea castanea Simon, 1896 — Tanzania (Zanzibar)
 Brachyphaea hulli Lessert, 1921 — East Africa
 Brachyphaea proxima Lessert, 1921 — East Africa
 Brachyphaea simoni Simon, 1895 (type) — East Africa
 Brachyphaea simpliciaculeata Caporiacco, 1949 — Kenya
 Brachyphaea vulpina Simon, 1896 — Mozambique

C

Cambalida

Cambalida Simon, 1910
 Cambalida compressa Haddad, 2012 — West Africa
 Cambalida coriacea Simon, 1910 — West, Central Africa
 Cambalida deminuta (Simon, 1910) — West, Central Africa
 Cambalida deorsa Murthappa, Prajapati, Sankaran & Sebastian, 2016 — India
 Cambalida dhupgadensis Bodkhe, Uniyal & Kamble, 2016 — India
 Cambalida dippenaarae Haddad, 2012 — Southern Africa
 Cambalida fagei (Caporiacco, 1939) — Ethiopia
 Cambalida flavipes (Gravely, 1931) — India
 Cambalida fulvipes (Simon, 1896) — Africa
 Cambalida griswoldi Haddad, 2012 — Madagascar
 Cambalida lineata Haddad, 2012 — Madagascar
 Cambalida loricifera (Simon, 1886) — Senegal
 Cambalida tuma Murthappa, Prajapati, Sankaran & Sebastian, 2016 — India
 Cambalida unica Haddad, 2012 — Cameroon

Castianeira

Castianeira Keyserling, 1879
 Castianeira abuelita Reiskind, 1969 — Panama
 Castianeira adhartali Gajbe, 2003 — India
 Castianeira alata Muma, 1945 — USA
 Castianeira alba Reiskind, 1969 — Costa Rica, Panama
 Castianeira albivulvae Mello-Leitão, 1922 — Brazil
 Castianeira albomaculata Berland, 1922 — Kenya
 Castianeira albopicta Gravely, 1931 — India
 Castianeira alfa Reiskind, 1969 — USA
 Castianeira alteranda Gertsch, 1942 — USA, Canada
 Castianeira amiantis Butt & Beg, 2001 — Pakistan
 Castianeira amoena (C. L. Koch, 1841) — USA, Mexico
 Castianeira antinorii (Pavesi, 1880) — Algeria, Tunisia, Sudan, Egypt
 Castianeira arcistriata Yin, Xie, Gong & Kim, 1996 — China
 Castianeira argentina Mello-Leitão, 1942 — Argentina
 Castianeira arnoldii Charitonov, 1946 — Iran, Turkmenistan, Uzbekistan
 Castianeira athena Reiskind, 1969 — USA, Mexico
 Castianeira atypica Mello-Leitão, 1929 — Brazil
 Castianeira azteca Reiskind, 1969 — Mexico
 Castianeira badia (Simon, 1877) — Portugal, Spain
 Castianeira bartholini Simon, 1901 — East Africa
 Castianeira bengalensis Biswas, 1984 — India
 Castianeira bicolor (Simon, 1890) — East Africa
 Castianeira brevis Keyserling, 1891 — Brazil
 Castianeira brunellii Caporiacco, 1940 — Ethiopia
 Castianeira buelowae Mello-Leitão, 1946 — Paraguay
 Castianeira carvalhoi Mello-Leitão, 1947 — Brazil
 Castianeira cecchii (Pavesi, 1883) — Ethiopia, East Africa
 Castianeira chrysura Mello-Leitão, 1943 — Brazil
 Castianeira cincta (Banks, 1929) — Panama
 Castianeira cingulata (C. L. Koch, 1841) — USA, Canada
 Castianeira claveroensis Mello-Leitão, 1943 — Argentina
 Castianeira coquito Rubio, Zapata & Grismado, 2015 — Argentina
 Castianeira crocata (Hentz, 1847) — USA
 Castianeira crucigera (Hentz, 1847) — USA
 Castianeira cubana (Banks, 1926) — USA, Cuba, Panama
 Castianeira cyclindracea Simon, 1896 — Brazil
 Castianeira daoxianensis Yin, Xie, Gong & Kim, 1996 — China
 Castianeira delicatula Simon, 1910 — Sierra Leone
 Castianeira dentata Chickering, 1937 — Panama
 Castianeira descripta (Hentz, 1847) — USA, Canada
 Castianeira dorsata (Banks, 1898) — USA, Mexico
 Castianeira drassodidoides Strand, 1915 — Israel
 Castianeira dubia (O. Pickard-Cambridge, 1898) — Mexico to Panama
 Castianeira dubia Mello-Leitão, 1922 — Brazil
 Castianeira dugesi (Becker, 1879) — Mexico
 Castianeira flavimaculata Hu, Song & Zheng, 1985 — China
 Castianeira flavipatellata Yin, Xie, Gong & Kim, 1996 — China
 Castianeira flebilis O. Pickard-Cambridge, 1898 — Mexico
 Castianeira floridana (Banks, 1904) — USA, Cuba
 Castianeira formosula Simon, 1910 — Equatorial Guinea (Bioko)
 Castianeira furva Sankaran, Malamel, Joseph & Sebastian, 2015 — India
 Castianeira fusconigra Berland, 1922 — Kenya
 Castianeira gaucha Mello-Leitão, 1943 — Brazil
 Castianeira gertschi Kaston, 1945 — USA, Canada
 Castianeira guapa Reiskind, 1969 — Panama
 Castianeira himalayensis Gravely, 1931 — India
 Castianeira hongkong Song, Zhu & Wu, 1997 — China
 Castianeira indica Tikader, 1981 — India
 Castianeira inquinata (Thorell, 1890) — Indonesia (Sumatra)
 Castianeira insulicola Strand, 1916 — East Africa
 Castianeira isophthalma Mello-Leitão, 1930 — Brazil
 Castianeira lachrymosa (O. Pickard-Cambridge, 1898) — Mexico
 Castianeira leptopoda Mello-Leitão, 1929 — Brazil
 Castianeira littoralis Mello-Leitão, 1926 — Brazil
 Castianeira longipalpa (Hentz, 1847) — USA, Canada
 Castianeira luctifera Petrunkevitch, 1911 — USA
 Castianeira luctuosa O. Pickard-Cambridge, 1898 — Mexico
 Castianeira luteipes Mello-Leitão, 1922 — Brazil
 Castianeira maculata Keyserling, 1891 — Brazil
 Castianeira majungae Simon, 1896 — Madagascar
 Castianeira memnonia (C. L. Koch, 1841) — Panama
 Castianeira mexicana (Banks, 1898) — USA, Mexico
 Castianeira micaria (Simon, 1886) — Senegal
 Castianeira minensis Mello-Leitão, 1926 — Brazil
 Castianeira munieri (Simon, 1877) — Morocco, Algeria
 Castianeira nanella Gertsch, 1933 — USA, Mexico
 Castianeira obscura Keyserling, 1891 — Brazil
 Castianeira occidens Reiskind, 1969 — USA, Mexico
 Castianeira onerosa (Keyserling, 1891) — Brazil
 Castianeira patellaris Mello-Leitão, 1943 — Brazil
 Castianeira peregrina (Gertsch, 1935) — USA
 Castianeira phaeochroa Simon, 1910 — Guinea-Bissau
 Castianeira pictipes Mello-Leitão, 1942 — Argentina
 Castianeira plorans (O. Pickard-Cambridge, 1898) — Mexico
 Castianeira polyacantha Mello-Leitão, 1929 — Brazil
 Castianeira pugnax Mello-Leitão, 1948 — Guyana
 Castianeira pulcherrima (O. Pickard-Cambridge, 1874) — Andes
 Castianeira quadrimaculata Reimoser, 1934 — India
 Castianeira quadritaeniata (Simon, 1905) — Indonesia (Java), Philippines
 Castianeira quechua Chamberlin, 1916 — Peru
 Castianeira rica Reiskind, 1969 — Mexico to Costa Rica
 Castianeira rothi Reiskind, 1969 — USA
 Castianeira rubicunda Keyserling, 1879 (type) — Colombia
 Castianeira rugosa Denis, 1958 — Afghanistan
 Castianeira russellsmithi Deeleman-Reinhold, 2001 — Indonesia (Sulawesi)
 Castianeira rutilans Simon, 1896 — Brazil
 Castianeira salticina (Taczanowski, 1874) — French Guiana
 Castianeira scutata Schmidt, 1971 — Brazil
 Castianeira setosa Mello-Leitão, 1947 — Brazil
 Castianeira sexmaculata Mello-Leitão, 1926 — Brazil
 Castianeira shaxianensis Gong, 1983 — China, Korea, Japan
 Castianeira similis (Banks, 1929) — Mexico to Panama
 Castianeira soyauxi (Karsch, 1879) — Congo
 Castianeira spinipalpis Mello-Leitão, 1945 — Argentina
 Castianeira stylifera Kraus, 1955 — El Salvador
 Castianeira tenuiformis Simon, 1896 — Bolivia, Paraguay
 Castianeira tenuis Simon, 1896 — Brazil
 Castianeira teres Simon, 1897 — Paraguay
 Castianeira thalia Reiskind, 1969 — USA
 Castianeira thomensis Simon, 1910 — São Tomé and Príncipe
 Castianeira tinae Patel & Patel, 1973 — India, China
 Castianeira trifasciata Yin, Xie, Gong & Kim, 1996 — China
 Castianeira trilineata (Hentz, 1847) — USA, Canada
 Castianeira trimac Reiskind, 1969 — Panama
 Castianeira truncata Kraus, 1955 — El Salvador
 Castianeira valida Keyserling, 1891 — Brazil
 Castianeira variata Gertsch, 1942 — USA, Canada
 Castianeira venusta (Banks, 1898) — Mexico, Guatemala
 Castianeira venustula (Pavesi, 1895) — Ethiopia
 Castianeira virgulifera Mello-Leitão, 1922 — Brazil
 Castianeira vittatula Roewer, 1951 — Brazil
 Castianeira vulnerea Gertsch, 1942 — USA
 Castianeira walsinghami (O. Pickard-Cambridge, 1874) — USA, Canada
 Castianeira xanthomela Mello-Leitão, 1941 — Argentina
 Castianeira zembla Reiskind, 1969 — Mexico
 Castianeira zetes Simon, 1897 — Pakistan, India, Bangladesh
 Castianeira zionis (Chamberlin & Woodbury, 1929) — USA

Castoponera

Castoponera Deeleman-Reinhold, 2001
 Castoponera christae Yamasaki, 2016 — Borneo
 Castoponera ciliata (Deeleman-Reinhold, 1993) (type) — Malaysia, Indonesia (Sumatra)
 Castoponera lecythus Deeleman-Reinhold, 2001 — Borneo
 Castoponera scotopoda (Deeleman-Reinhold, 1993) — Borneo

Coenoptychus

Coenoptychus Simon, 1885
 Coenoptychus mutillicus (Haddad, 2004) — Ivory Coast, Ethiopia, Tanzania, South Africa
 Coenoptychus pulcher Simon, 1885 (type) — India, Sri Lanka
 Coenoptychus tropicalis (Haddad, 2004) — Ivory Coast, DR Congo, Tanzania, South Africa

Copa

Copa Simon, 1886
 Copa annulata Simon, 1896 — Sri Lanka
 Copa auroplumosa Strand, 1907 — Madagascar
 Copa flavoplumosa Simon, 1886 (type) — West, Central, East, South Africa
 Copa kabana Raven, 2015 — Australia (Queensland, New South Wales)
 Copa kei Haddad, 2013 — South Africa
 Copa lineata Simon, 1903 — Madagascar
 Copa spinosa Simon, 1896 — Sri Lanka

Copuetta

Copuetta Haddad, 2013
 Copuetta comorica Haddad, 2013 — Comoros
 Copuetta erecta Haddad, 2013 — Mozambique, South Africa
 Copuetta kakamega Haddad, 2013 — Kenya
 Copuetta kwamgumi Haddad, 2013 — Tanzania
 Copuetta lacustris (Strand, 1916) — Central, East, Southern Africa
 Copuetta lesnei Haddad, 2013 — Mozambique
 Copuetta litipo Haddad, 2013 — Tanzania
 Copuetta lotzi Haddad, 2013 — South Africa
 Copuetta magna Haddad, 2013 — Tanzania, Mozambique, South Africa
 Copuetta maputa Haddad, 2013 (type) — Mozambique, South Africa
 Copuetta naja Haddad, 2013 — Tanzania
 Copuetta uzungwa Haddad, 2013 — Tanzania
 Copuetta wagneri Haddad, 2013 — Uganda

Corinna

Corinna C. L. Koch, 1841
 Corinna aberrans Franganillo, 1926 — Cuba
 Corinna aechmea Rodrigues & Bonaldo, 2014 — Brazil
 Corinna aenea Simon, 1896 — Brazil
 Corinna alticeps (Keyserling, 1891) — Brazil
 Corinna andina (Simon, 1898) — Ecuador
 Corinna annulipes (Taczanowski, 1874) — Brazil, French Guiana, Peru
 Corinna anomala Schmidt, 1971 — Ecuador
 Corinna areolata Thorell, 1899 — Cameroon
 Corinna balacobaco Rodrigues & Bonaldo, 2014 — Brazil
 Corinna bicincta Simon, 1896 — Brazil
 Corinna bonneti Caporiacco, 1947 — Guyana
 Corinna botucatensis (Keyserling, 1891) — Brazil
 Corinna bristoweana Mello-Leitão, 1926 — Brazil
 Corinna brunneipeltula Strand, 1911 — New Guinea
 Corinna buccosa Simon, 1896 — Brazil (Amazonas)
 Corinna bulbosa F. O. Pickard-Cambridge, 1899 — Mexico to Panama
 Corinna bulbula F. O. Pickard-Cambridge, 1899 — Panama
 Corinna caatinga Rodrigues & Bonaldo, 2014 — Brazil
 Corinna capito (Lucas, 1857) — Brazil
 Corinna chickeringi (Caporiacco, 1955) — Venezuela
 Corinna colombo Bonaldo, 2000 — Brazil, Argentina
 Corinna corvina Simon, 1896 — Paraguay
 Corinna cribrata (Simon, 1886) — Tanzania (Zanzibar)
 Corinna cruenta (Bertkau, 1880) — Brazil
 Corinna demersa Rodrigues & Bonaldo, 2014 — Brazil
 Corinna ducke Bonaldo, 2000 — Brazil
 Corinna eresiformis Simon, 1896 — Brazil (Amazonas)
 Corinna escalvada Rodrigues & Bonaldo, 2014 — Brazil
 Corinna ferox Simon, 1896 — Brazil, Peru
 Corinna galeata Simon, 1896 — Brazil
 Corinna granadensis (L. Koch, 1866) — Colombia
 Corinna grandis (Simon, 1898) — Brazil, Guyana
 Corinna haemorrhoa (Bertkau, 1880) — Brazil
 Corinna hyalina Rodrigues & Bonaldo, 2014 — Brazil
 Corinna ignota Mello-Leitão, 1922 — Brazil
 Corinna inermis (Bertkau, 1880) — Brazil
 Corinna javuyae Petrunkevitch, 1930 — Puerto Rico
 Corinna jecatatu Rodrigues & Bonaldo, 2014 — Brazil
 Corinna kochi (Simon, 1898) — Colombia
 Corinna kuryi Rodrigues & Bonaldo, 2014 — Brazil
 Corinna loiolai Rodrigues & Bonaldo, 2014 — Brazil
 Corinna longitarsis Strand, 1906 — São Tomé and Príncipe
 Corinna loricata (Bertkau, 1880) — Brazil, Uruguay, Paraguay, Argentina
 Corinna macra (L. Koch, 1866) — Colombia
 Corinna major Berland, 1922 — Kenya
 Corinna mandibulata Strand, 1906 — Ethiopia
 Corinna maracas Rodrigues & Bonaldo, 2014 — Brazil
 Corinna mexicana (Banks, 1898) — Mexico
 Corinna modesta Banks, 1909 — Costa Rica
 Corinna mourai Bonaldo, 2000 — Brazil
 Corinna napaea Simon, 1898 — St. Vincent
 Corinna nitens (Keyserling, 1891) — Peru, Bolivia, Brazil, Uruguay, Paraguay, Argentina
 Corinna nossibeensis Strand, 1907 — Madagascar
 Corinna octodentata Franganillo, 1946 — Cuba
 Corinna olivacea Strand, 1906 — Ethiopia
 Corinna parva (Keyserling, 1891) — Brazil
 Corinna parvula Bryant, 1940 — Cuba, Hispaniola
 Corinna peninsulana Banks, 1898 — Mexico
 Corinna perida Chickering, 1972 — Panama
 Corinna phalerata Simon, 1896 — Brazil
 Corinna pictipes Banks, 1909 — Costa Rica
 Corinna plumipes (Bertkau, 1880) — Brazil
 Corinna propera (Dyal, 1935) — Pakistan
 Corinna pulchella (Bryant, 1948) — Dominican Rep.
 Corinna punicea Simon, 1898 — St. Vincent
 Corinna recurva Bonaldo, 2000 — Brazil
 Corinna regii Rodrigues & Bonaldo, 2014 — Brazil
 Corinna rubripes C. L. Koch, 1841 (type) — Brazil, Guyana
 Corinna sanguinea Strand, 1906 — Ethiopia
 Corinna sanguinea inquirenda Strand, 1906 — Ethiopia
 Corinna selysi (Bertkau, 1880) — Brazil
 Corinna spinifera (Keyserling, 1887) — Nicaragua
 Corinna tatei Gertsch, 1942 — Venezuela
 Corinna telecoteco Rodrigues & Bonaldo, 2014 — Brazil
 Corinna testacea (Banks, 1898) — Mexico
 Corinna toussainti Bryant, 1948 — Hispaniola
 Corinna tranquilla Rodrigues & Bonaldo, 2014 — Brazil
 Corinna travassosi Mello-Leitão, 1939 — Brazil
 Corinna urbanae Soares & Camargo, 1948 — Brazil
 Corinna variegata F. O. Pickard-Cambridge, 1899 — Guatemala, Guyana
 Corinna venezuelica (Caporiacco, 1955) — Venezuela
 Corinna vesperata Rodrigues & Bonaldo, 2014 — Brazil
 Corinna vilanovae Rodrigues & Bonaldo, 2014 — Brazil
 Corinna zecarioca Rodrigues & Bonaldo, 2014 — Brazil
 Corinna ziriguidum Rodrigues & Bonaldo, 2014 — Brazil

Corinnomma

Corinnomma Karsch, 1880
 Corinnomma afghanicum Roewer, 1962 — Afghanistan
 Corinnomma albobarbatum Simon, 1898 — St. Vincent
 Corinnomma comulatum Thorell, 1891 — India (Nicobar Is.)
 Corinnomma javanum Simon, 1905 — Thailand, Singapore, Indonesia (Java, Borneo)
 Corinnomma lawrencei Haddad, 2006 — Tanzania, Mozambique, South Africa
 Corinnomma moerens Thorell, 1890 — Indonesia (Sumatra)
 Corinnomma olivaceum Simon, 1896 — Ethiopia
 Corinnomma plumosa (Thorell, 1881) — Indonesia (Moluccas)
 Corinnomma rapax Deeleman-Reinhold, 1993 — Indonesia (Sumatra, Borneo)
 Corinnomma rufofuscum Reimoser, 1934 — India
 Corinnomma semiglabrum (Simon, 1896) — Zimbabwe, South Africa, Swaziland
 Corinnomma severum (Thorell, 1877) (type) — India to China, Philippines, Indonesia (Sumatra, Sulawesi)
 Corinnomma thorelli Simon, 1905 — Indonesia (Java)
 Corinnomma yulinguana Barrion, Barrion-Dupo & Heong, 2013 — China

Creugas

Creugas Thorell, 1878
 Creugas annamae (Gertsch & Davis, 1940) — Mexico
 Creugas apophysarius (Caporiacco, 1947) — Guyana
 Creugas bajulus (Gertsch, 1942) — Mexico
 Creugas bellator (L. Koch, 1866) — Venezuela, Colombia, Ecuador
 Creugas berlandi Bonaldo, 2000 — Ecuador
 Creugas bicuspis (F. O. Pickard-Cambridge, 1899) — Mexico
 Creugas cinnamius Simon, 1888 — Mexico
 Creugas comondensis Jiménez, 2007 — Mexico
 Creugas epicureanus (Chamberlin, 1924) — Mexico
 Creugas falculus (F. O. Pickard-Cambridge, 1899) — Mexico
 Creugas guaycura Jiménez, 2008 — Mexico
 Creugas gulosus Thorell, 1878 (type) — Southern America. Introduced to Africa, Myanmar, Australia, Pacific islands
 Creugas lisei Bonaldo, 2000 — Brazil, Uruguay, Argentina
 Creugas mucronatus (F. O. Pickard-Cambridge, 1899) — Costa Rica, Panama
 Creugas navus (F. O. Pickard-Cambridge, 1899) — Mexico
 Creugas nigricans (C. L. Koch, 1841) — Mexico, Colombia
 Creugas plumatus (L. Koch, 1866) — Colombia
 Creugas praeceps (F. O. Pickard-Cambridge, 1899) — Mexico
 Creugas silvaticus (Chickering, 1937) — Panama
 Creugas uncatus (F. O. Pickard-Cambridge, 1899) — Mexico

Crinopseudoa

Crinopseudoa Jocqué & Bosselaers, 2011
 Crinopseudoa billeni Jocqué & Bosselaers, 2011 — Guinea
 Crinopseudoa bong Jocqué & Bosselaers, 2011 (type) — Liberia
 Crinopseudoa bongella Jocqué & Bosselaers, 2011 — Liberia
 Crinopseudoa caligula Jocqué & Bosselaers, 2011 — Liberia
 Crinopseudoa catharinae Jocqué & Bosselaers, 2011 — Guinea, Liberia
 Crinopseudoa ephialtes Jocqué & Bosselaers, 2011 — Guinea
 Crinopseudoa flomoi Jocqué & Bosselaers, 2011 — Liberia
 Crinopseudoa leiothorax Jocqué & Bosselaers, 2011 — Guinea
 Crinopseudoa otus Jocqué & Bosselaers, 2011 — Guinea
 Crinopseudoa paucigranulata Jocqué & Bosselaers, 2011 — Guinea
 Crinopseudoa titan Jocqué & Bosselaers, 2011 — Guinea

Cycais

Cycais Thorell, 1877
 Cycais cylindrata Thorell, 1877 (type) — Indonesia (Sulawesi)
 Cycais gracilis Karsch, 1879 — Japan

D

Disnyssus

Disnyssus Raven, 2015
 Disnyssus helenmirrenae Raven, 2015 (type) — Australia (Queensland)
 Disnyssus judidenchae Raven, 2015 — Australia (Queensland)

E

Echinax

Echinax Deeleman-Reinhold, 2001
 Echinax anlongensis Yang, Song & Zhu, 2004 — China
 Echinax bosmansi (Deeleman-Reinhold, 1995) — Indonesia (Sulawesi)
 Echinax clara Haddad, 2012 — Ghana, Congo
 Echinax hesperis Haddad, 2012 — Ivory Coast
 Echinax javana (Deeleman-Reinhold, 1995) — Indonesia (Java)
 Echinax longespina (Simon, 1910) — West, Central, East Africa
 Echinax natalensis Haddad, 2012 — South Africa
 Echinax oxyopoides (Deeleman-Reinhold, 1995) (type) — China, Indonesia (Sumatra), Borneo
 Echinax panache Deeleman-Reinhold, 2001 — China, India, Thailand
 Echinax scharffi Haddad, 2012 — Tanzania
 Echinax similis Haddad, 2012 — South Africa
 Echinax spatulata Haddad, 2012 — West, Central, East Africa

Ecitocobius

Ecitocobius Bonaldo & Brescovit, 1998
 Ecitocobius comissator Bonaldo & Brescovit, 1998 (type) — Brazil

Erendira

Erendira Bonaldo, 2000
 Erendira atrox (Caporiacco, 1955) — Venezuela
 Erendira luteomaculata (Petrunkevitch, 1925) — Panama
 Erendira pallidoguttata (Simon, 1898) (type) — Puerto Rico, Lesser Antilles
 Erendira pictithorax (Caporiacco, 1955) — Venezuela
 Erendira subsignata (Simon, 1898) — St. Vincent

F

Falconina

Falconina Brignoli, 1985
 Falconina albomaculosa (Schmidt, 1971) — Ecuador
 Falconina crassipalpis (Chickering, 1937) — Panama, Cuba
 Falconina gracilis (Keyserling, 1891) — Brazil, Paraguay, Argentina. Introduced to USA
 Falconina melloi (Schenkel, 1953) (type) — Colombia, Venezuela

G

Graptartia

Graptartia Simon, 1896
 Graptartia granulosa Simon, 1896 (type) — Central, East, Southern Africa
 Graptartia scabra (Simon, 1878) — Morocco, Algeria

H

Hortipes

Hortipes Bosselaers & Ledoux, 1998
 Hortipes abucoletus Bosselaers & Jocqué, 2000 — Cameroon
 Hortipes aelurisiepae Bosselaers & Jocqué, 2000 — South Africa
 Hortipes alderweireldti Bosselaers & Jocqué, 2000 — Equatorial Guinea
 Hortipes amphibolus Bosselaers & Jocqué, 2000 — Congo
 Hortipes anansiodatus Bosselaers & Jocqué, 2000 — Cameroon
 Hortipes angariopsis Bosselaers & Jocqué, 2000 — Tanzania
 Hortipes arboricola Ledoux & Emerit, 1998 — Gabon
 Hortipes architelones Bosselaers & Jocqué, 2000 — Cameroon
 Hortipes atalante Bosselaers & Jocqué, 2000 — South Africa
 Hortipes auriga Bosselaers & Jocqué, 2000 — Congo
 Hortipes aurora Bosselaers & Jocqué, 2000 — Congo
 Hortipes baerti Bosselaers & Jocqué, 2000 — Ivory Coast
 Hortipes bjorni Bosselaers & Jocqué, 2000 — Tanzania
 Hortipes bosmansi Bosselaers & Jocqué, 2000 — Cameroon
 Hortipes calliblepharus Bosselaers & Jocqué, 2000 — Cameroon
 Hortipes castor Bosselaers & Jocqué, 2000 — Tanzania
 Hortipes centralis Bosselaers & Jocqué, 2000 — Congo
 Hortipes chrysothemis Bosselaers & Jocqué, 2000 — Cameroon
 Hortipes coccinatus Bosselaers & Jocqué, 2000 — South Africa
 Hortipes contubernalis Bosselaers & Jocqué, 2000 — South Africa
 Hortipes creber Bosselaers & Jocqué, 2000 — Tanzania
 Hortipes cucurbita Bosselaers & Jocqué, 2000 — Tanzania
 Hortipes delphinus Bosselaers & Jocqué, 2000 — Tanzania
 Hortipes depravator Bosselaers & Jocqué, 2000 — Cameroon
 Hortipes echo Bosselaers & Jocqué, 2000 — Congo
 Hortipes exoptans Bosselaers & Jocqué, 2000 — Tanzania
 Hortipes falcatus Bosselaers & Jocqué, 2000 — Congo, Rwanda, Uganda
 Hortipes fastigiensis Bosselaers & Jocqué, 2000 — Tanzania
 Hortipes fortipes Bosselaers & Jocqué, 2000 — Equatorial Guinea
 Hortipes gigapophysalis Jocqué, Bosselaers & Henrard, 2012 — Guinea
 Hortipes griswoldi Bosselaers & Jocqué, 2000 — South Africa
 Hortipes hastatus Bosselaers & Jocqué, 2000 — Congo, Uganda
 Hortipes hesperoecius Bosselaers & Jocqué, 2000 — Sierra Leone
 Hortipes hormigricola Bosselaers & Jocqué, 2000 — Cameroon
 Hortipes horta Bosselaers & Jocqué, 2000 — Congo
 Hortipes hyakutake Bosselaers & Jocqué, 2000 — South Africa
 Hortipes irimus Bosselaers & Jocqué, 2000 — South Africa
 Hortipes klumpkeae Bosselaers & Jocqué, 2000 — Tanzania
 Hortipes lejeunei Bosselaers & Jocqué, 2000 — Congo, Rwanda
 Hortipes leno Bosselaers & Jocqué, 2000 — Tanzania
 Hortipes libidinosus Bosselaers & Jocqué, 2000 — Tanzania
 Hortipes licnophorus Bosselaers & Jocqué, 2000 — South Africa
 Hortipes limicola Ledoux & Emerit, 1998 — Gabon
 Hortipes luytenae Bosselaers & Ledoux, 1998 (type) — South Africa
 Hortipes machaeropolion Bosselaers & Jocqué, 2000 — Nigeria
 Hortipes marginatus Ledoux & Emerit, 1998 — Ivory Coast
 Hortipes merwei Bosselaers & Jocqué, 2000 — South Africa
 Hortipes mesembrinus Bosselaers & Jocqué, 2000 — South Africa
 Hortipes mulciber Bosselaers & Jocqué, 2000 — Tanzania
 Hortipes narcissus Bosselaers & Jocqué, 2000 — Congo
 Hortipes orchatocnemis Bosselaers & Jocqué, 2000 — Malawi
 Hortipes oronesiotes Bosselaers & Jocqué, 2000 — Malawi
 Hortipes ostiovolutus Bosselaers & Jocqué, 2000 — Tanzania
 Hortipes paludigena Ledoux & Emerit, 1998 — Gabon
 Hortipes penthesileia Bosselaers & Jocqué, 2000 — Malawi
 Hortipes platnicki Bosselaers & Jocqué, 2000 — Tanzania
 Hortipes pollux Bosselaers & Jocqué, 2000 — Malawi
 Hortipes puylaerti Bosselaers & Jocqué, 2000 — Cameroon
 Hortipes robertus Bosselaers & Jocqué, 2000 — Cameroon
 Hortipes rothorum Bosselaers & Jocqué, 2000 — South Africa
 Hortipes salticola Bosselaers & Jocqué, 2000 — Tanzania
 Hortipes sceptrum Bosselaers & Jocqué, 2000 — Cameroon
 Hortipes scharffi Bosselaers & Jocqué, 2000 — Tanzania
 Hortipes schoemanae Bosselaers & Jocqué, 2000 — South Africa
 Hortipes silvarum Ledoux & Emerit, 1998 — Ivory Coast
 Hortipes stoltzei Bosselaers & Jocqué, 2000 — Tanzania
 Hortipes tarachodes Bosselaers & Jocqué, 2000 — Congo
 Hortipes terminator Bosselaers & Jocqué, 2000 — Congo
 Hortipes wimmertensi Bosselaers & Jocqué, 2000 — South Africa
 Hortipes zombaensis Bosselaers & Jocqué, 2000 — Malawi

Humua

Humua Ono, 1987
 Humua takeuchii Ono, 1987 (type) — Japan (Ryukyu Is.)

I

Ianduba

Ianduba Bonaldo, 1997
 Ianduba abara Bonaldo & Brescovit, 2007 — Brazil
 Ianduba acaraje Magalhaes, Fernandes, Ramírez & Bonaldo, 2016 — Brazil
 Ianduba angeloi Magalhaes, Fernandes, Ramírez & Bonaldo, 2016 — Brazil
 Ianduba apururuca Magalhaes, Fernandes, Ramírez & Bonaldo, 2016 — Brazil
 Ianduba beaga Magalhaes, Fernandes, Ramírez & Bonaldo, 2016 — Brazil
 Ianduba benjori Magalhaes, Fernandes, Ramírez & Bonaldo, 2016 — Brazil
 Ianduba capixaba Magalhaes, Fernandes, Ramírez & Bonaldo, 2016 — Brazil
 Ianduba caxixe Bonaldo, 1997 — Brazil
 Ianduba dabadu Magalhaes, Fernandes, Ramírez & Bonaldo, 2016 — Brazil
 Ianduba liberta Magalhaes, Fernandes, Ramírez & Bonaldo, 2016 — Brazil
 Ianduba mugunza Bonaldo & Brescovit, 2007 — Brazil
 Ianduba patua Bonaldo, 1997 — Brazil
 Ianduba paubrasil Bonaldo, 1997 — Brazil
 Ianduba varia (Keyserling, 1891) — Brazil, Argentina
 Ianduba vatapa Bonaldo, 1997 (type) — Brazil

Iridonyssus

Iridonyssus Raven, 2015
 Iridonyssus auripilosus Raven, 2015 — Australia (Queensland)
 Iridonyssus formicans Raven, 2015 — Australia (Queensland to Victoria, Western Australia, South Australia)
 Iridonyssus kohouti Raven, 2015 (type) — Australia (Queensland)
 Iridonyssus leucostaurus Raven, 2015 — Australia (Queensland)

K

Kolora

Kolora Raven, 2015
 Kolora cooloola Raven, 2015 (type) — Australia (Queensland)
 Kolora cushingae Raven, 2015 — Australia (Queensland)
 Kolora lynneae Raven, 2015 — Australia (Queensland)
 Kolora suaverubens (Simon, 1896) — Australia (Queensland)

L

Leichhardteus

Leichhardteus Raven & Baehr, 2013
 Leichhardteus albofasciatus Baehr & Raven, 2013 — Australia (Queensland, New South Wales)
 Leichhardteus badius Baehr & Raven, 2013 — Australia (Queensland)
 Leichhardteus bimaculatus Baehr & Raven, 2013 — Australia (Queensland)
 Leichhardteus conopalpis Baehr & Raven, 2013 (type) — Eastern Australia
 Leichhardteus evschlingeri Raven, 2015 — Australia (Western Australia)
 Leichhardteus garretti Baehr & Raven, 2013 — Australia (Queensland)
 Leichhardteus kroombit Baehr & Raven, 2013 — Australia (Queensland, New South Wales)
 Leichhardteus reinhardi Baehr & Raven, 2013 — Australia (Queensland)
 Leichhardteus strzelecki Raven, 2015 — Australia (Victoria)
 Leichhardteus terriirwinae Baehr & Raven, 2013 — Australia (Queensland)
 Leichhardteus yagan Raven, 2015 — Australia (Western Australia)

Leptopicia

Leptopicia Raven, 2015
 Leptopicia bimaculata (Simon, 1896) (type) — Australia (Queensland)

M

Mandaneta

Mandaneta Strand, 1932
 Mandaneta sudana (Karsch, 1880) (type) — Ghana, Congo

Mazax

Mazax O. Pickard-Cambridge, 1898
 Mazax ajax Reiskind, 1969 — Mexico
 Mazax chickeringi Reiskind, 1969 — Jamaica
 Mazax kaspari Cokendolpher, 1978 — USA
 Mazax pax Reiskind, 1969 (type) — USA to Panama
 Mazax ramirezi Rubio & Danişman, 2014 — Argentina
 Mazax spinosa (Simon, 1898) — Central America, Lesser Antilles
 Mazax xerxes Reiskind, 1969 — Costa Rica

Medmassa

Medmassa Simon, 1887
 Medmassa celebensis (Deeleman-Reinhold, 1995) — Indonesia (Sulawesi)
 Medmassa christae Raven, 2015 — Australia (Queensland)
 Medmassa diplogale Deeleman-Reinhold, 2001 — Borneo
 Medmassa frenata (Simon, 1877) (type) — Philippines
 Medmassa insignis (Thorell, 1890) — Indonesia (Sumatra, Borneo)
 Medmassa kltina (Barrion & Litsinger, 1995) — Philippines
 Medmassa pulchra (Thorell, 1881) — New Guinea
 Medmassa semiaurantiaca Simon, 1910 — Africa
 Medmassa tigris (Deeleman-Reinhold, 1995) — Indonesia (Sumatra, Borneo)
 Medmassa torta Jin, H. Zhang & F. Zhang, 2019 — China (Hainan)

Megalostrata

Megalostrata Karsch, 1880
 Megalostrata bruneri (Bryant, 1936) — Cuba
 Megalostrata depicta (O. Pickard-Cambridge, 1895) — Mexico
 Megalostrata monistica (Chamberlin, 1924) — Mexico
 Megalostrata raptor (L. Koch, 1866) (type) — Mexico to Panama

Melanesotypus

Melanesotypus Raven, 2015
 Melanesotypus guadal Raven, 2015 (type) — Solomon Is.

Merenius

Merenius Simon, 1910
 Merenius alberti Lessert, 1923 — Southern Africa
 Merenius concolor Caporiacco, 1947 — Tanzania
 Merenius myrmex Simon, 1910 — Guinea-Bissau
 Merenius plumosus Simon, 1910 (type) — Guinea-Bissau
 Merenius proximus Lessert, 1929 — Congo
 Merenius proximus quadrimaculatus Lessert, 1946 — Congo
 Merenius recurvatus (Strand, 1906) — Ethiopia, East Africa
 Merenius secundus (Strand, 1907) — Tanzania
 Merenius simoni Lessert, 1921 — Congo, East Africa
 Merenius solitarius Lessert, 1946 — Congo
 Merenius tenuiculus Simon, 1910 — Sierra Leone
 Merenius yemenensis Denis, 1953 — Yemen

Messapus

Messapus Simon, 1898
 Messapus martini Simon, 1898 (type) — Zambia, South Africa
 Messapus megae Haddad & Mbo, 2015 — Zimbabwe
 Messapus meridionalis Haddad & Mbo, 2015 — South Africa
 Messapus natalis (Pocock, 1898) — Mozambique, South Africa
 Messapus seiugatus Haddad & Mbo, 2015 — Guinea
 Messapus tigris Haddad & Mbo, 2015 — Botswana, Namibia
 Messapus tropicus Haddad & Mbo, 2015 — Congo

Methesis

Methesis Simon, 1896
 Methesis brevitarsa Caporiacco, 1954 — French Guiana
 Methesis semirufa Simon, 1896 (type) — Colombia, Brazil, Peru, Bolivia

Myrmecium

Myrmecium Latreille, 1824
 Myrmecium amphora Candiani & Bonaldo, 2017 — Venezuela
 Myrmecium bifasciatum Taczanowski, 1874 — Bolivia, Trinidad, Guyana, Suriname, French Guiana, Brazil
 Myrmecium bolivari Candiani & Bonaldo, 2017 — Venezuela, Colombia
 Myrmecium bonaerense Holmberg, 1881 — Argentina
 Myrmecium camponotoides Mello-Leitão, 1932 — Brazil
 Myrmecium carajas Candiani & Bonaldo, 2017 — Brazil
 Myrmecium carvalhoi Candiani & Bonaldo, 2017 — Brazil
 Myrmecium catuxy Candiani & Bonaldo, 2017 — Colombia, Brazil
 Myrmecium chikish Candiani & Bonaldo, 2017 — Peru
 Myrmecium cizauskasi Candiani & Bonaldo, 2017 — Brazil
 Myrmecium dacetoniforme Mello-Leitão, 1932 — Brazil
 Myrmecium deladanta Candiani & Bonaldo, 2017 — Ecuador
 Myrmecium diasi Candiani & Bonaldo, 2017 — Brazil
 Myrmecium erici Candiani & Bonaldo, 2017 — Guyana
 Myrmecium ferro Candiani & Bonaldo, 2017 — Brazil
 Myrmecium fuscum Dahl, 1907 — Peru, Bolivia, Brazil
 Myrmecium indicattii Candiani & Bonaldo, 2017 — Brazil
 Myrmecium latreillei (Lucas, 1857) — Brazil
 Myrmecium lomanhungae Candiani & Bonaldo, 2017 — Brazil
 Myrmecium luepa Candiani & Bonaldo, 2017 — Venezuela
 Myrmecium machetero Candiani & Bonaldo, 2017 — Bolivia, Peru
 Myrmecium malleum Candiani & Bonaldo, 2017 — Venezuela, Colombia
 Myrmecium monacanthum Simon, 1897 — Colombia
 Myrmecium nogueirai Candiani & Bonaldo, 2017 — Peru, Brazil
 Myrmecium oliveirai Candiani & Bonaldo, 2017 — Brazil
 Myrmecium oompaloompa Candiani & Bonaldo, 2017 — Brazil, Guyana
 Myrmecium otti Candiani & Bonaldo, 2017 — Peru, Brazil
 Myrmecium pakpaka Candiani & Bonaldo, 2017 — Peru
 Myrmecium raveni Candiani & Bonaldo, 2017 — Brazil
 Myrmecium reticulatum Dahl, 1907 — Peru
 Myrmecium ricettii Candiani & Bonaldo, 2017 — Colombia, Brazil
 Myrmecium rufum Latreille, 1824 (type) — Brazil
 Myrmecium souzai Candiani & Bonaldo, 2017 — Brazil
 Myrmecium tanguro Candiani & Bonaldo, 2017 — Brazil
 Myrmecium tikuna Candiani & Bonaldo, 2017 — Brazil
 Myrmecium trifasciatum Caporiacco, 1947 — Guyana, Brazil
 Myrmecium urucu Candiani & Bonaldo, 2017 — Brazil
 Myrmecium viehmeyeri Dahl, 1907 — Peru, Bolivia, Brazil
 Myrmecium yamamotoi Candiani & Bonaldo, 2017 — Suriname, Brazil

Myrmecotypus

Myrmecotypus O. Pickard-Cambridge, 1894
 Myrmecotypus fuliginosus O. Pickard-Cambridge, 1894 (type) — Mexico
 Myrmecotypus iguazu Rubio & Arbino, 2009 — Argentina
 Myrmecotypus jasmineae Leister & Miller, 2014 — Nicaragua
 Myrmecotypus lineatipes Chickering, 1937 — Panama
 Myrmecotypus lineatus (Emerton, 1909) — USA
 Myrmecotypus niger Chickering, 1937 — Panama
 Myrmecotypus olympus Reiskind, 1969 — Panama
 Myrmecotypus orpheus Reiskind, 1969 — Panama
 Myrmecotypus pilosus (O. Pickard-Cambridge, 1898) — Mexico to Panama
 Myrmecotypus rettenmeyeri Unzicker, 1965 — Panama

N

Nucastia

Nucastia Raven, 2015
 Nucastia culburra Raven, 2015 — Australia (South Australia)
 Nucastia eneabba Raven, 2015 — Australia (Western Australia)
 Nucastia muncoonie Raven, 2015 — Australia (Queensland)
 Nucastia supunnoides Raven, 2015 — Australia (Victoria)
 Nucastia virewoods Raven, 2015 (type) — Australia (Victoria)

Nyssus

Nyssus Walckenaer, 1805
 Nyssus albopunctatus (Hogg, 1896) — Australia (Northern Territory, New South Wales, Tasmania), New Zealand
 Nyssus avidus (Thorell, 1881) — Australia (Queensland)
 Nyssus coloripes Walckenaer, 1805 (type) — Australia (mainland, Tasmania). Introduced to New Zealand
 Nyssus emu Raven, 2015 — Australia (Queensland)
 Nyssus insularis (L. Koch, 1873) — Fiji, Solomon Is.
 Nyssus jaredwardeni Raven, 2015 — Australia (Queensland)
 Nyssus jonraveni Raven, 2015 — Australia (South Australia, Queensland)
 Nyssus loureedi Raven, 2015 — Australia (Lord Howe Is.)
 Nyssus luteofinis Raven, 2015 — Australia (Queensland)
 Nyssus paradoxus Raven, 2015 — Australia (Queensland)
 Nyssus pseudomaculatus Raven, 2015 — Australia (Queensland, New South Wales)
 Nyssus robertsi Raven, 2015 — Australia (Queensland)
 Nyssus semifuscus Raven, 2015 — Australia (Queensland)
 Nyssus wendyae Raven, 2015 — Australia (Queensland)
 Nyssus yuggera Raven, 2015 — Australia (Queensland, New South Wales)

O

Olbus

Olbus Simon, 1880
 Olbus eryngiophilus Ramírez, Lopardo & Bonaldo, 2001 — Chile
 Olbus jaguar Ramírez, Lopardo & Bonaldo, 2001 — Chile
 Olbus krypto Ramírez, Lopardo & Bonaldo, 2001 — Chile
 Olbus nahuelbuta Ramírez, Lopardo & Bonaldo, 2001 — Chile
 Olbus sparassoides (Nicolet, 1849) (type) — Chile

Ozcopa

Ozcopa Raven, 2015
 Ozcopa chiunei Raven, 2015 — Australia (Queensland)
 Ozcopa colloffi Raven, 2015 (type) — Australia (Queensland)
 Ozcopa margotandersenae Raven, 2015 — Australia (Queensland)
 Ozcopa mcdonaldi Raven, 2015 — Australia (Queensland)
 Ozcopa monteithi Raven, 2015 — Australia (Queensland)
 Ozcopa zborowskii Raven, 2015 — Australia (Queensland)

P

Parachemmis

Parachemmis Chickering, 1937
 Parachemmis fuscus Chickering, 1937 (type) — Panama
 Parachemmis hassleri (Gertsch, 1942) — Guyana
 Parachemmis julioblancoi Martinez-G & Villarreal, 2017 — Colombia
 Parachemmis manauara Bonaldo, 2000 — Brazil

Paradiestus

Paradiestus Mello-Leitão, 1915
 Paradiestus aurantiacus Mello-Leitão, 1915 (type) — Brazil
 Paradiestus egregius (Simon, 1896) — Brazil
 Paradiestus giganteus (Karsch, 1880) — Brazil
 Paradiestus penicillatus (Mello-Leitão, 1939) — Brazil
 Paradiestus vitiosus (Keyserling, 1891) — Brazil

Paramedmassa

Paramedmassa Jin, H. Zhang & F. Zhang, 2019
 Paramedmassa day (Dankittipakul & Singtripop, 2014) (type) — Thailand, Laos, China

Poecilipta

Poecilipta Simon, 1897
 Poecilipta carnarvon Raven, 2015 — Australia (Western Australia)
 Poecilipta contorqua Raven, 2015 — Australia (New South Wales)
 Poecilipta davidi Raven, 2015 — Australia (South Australia)
 Poecilipta elvis Raven, 2015 — Australia (Western Australia)
 Poecilipta formiciforme (Rainbow, 1904) — Australia (New South Wales)
 Poecilipta gloverae Raven, 2015 — Australia (Queensland)
 Poecilipta harveyi Raven, 2015 — Australia (Western Australia)
 Poecilipta janthina Simon, 1896 (type) — Australia (Queensland)
 Poecilipta jilbadji Raven, 2015 — Australia (Western Australia)
 Poecilipta kgari Raven, 2015 — Australia (Queensland)
 Poecilipta kohouti Raven, 2015 — Australia (Northern Territory, South Australia, Queensland, New South Wales)
 Poecilipta lugubris Raven, 2015 — Australia (New South Wales, Australian Capital Territory)
 Poecilipta mandjelia Raven, 2015 — New Caledonia
 Poecilipta marengo Raven, 2015 — Australia (New South Wales)
 Poecilipta metallica Raven, 2015 — Australia (Queensland)
 Poecilipta micaelae Raven, 2015 — Australia (New South Wales)
 Poecilipta qunats Raven, 2015 — Australia (Queensland)
 Poecilipta rawlinsonae Raven, 2015 — Australia (Western Australia)
 Poecilipta ruthae Santana & Raven, 2015 — Australia (Queensland)
 Poecilipta samueli Raven, 2015 — Australia (Queensland)
 Poecilipta smaragdinea (Simon, 1909) — Australia (Western Australia)
 Poecilipta tinda Raven, 2015 — Australia (South Australia)
 Poecilipta venusta Rainbow, 1904 — Australia (Queensland to Victoria, South Australia)
 Poecilipta waldockae Raven, 2015 — Australia (Western Australia)
 Poecilipta wallacei Raven, 2015 — Australia (Western Australia to Queensland)
 Poecilipta yambuna Raven, 2015 — Australia (Victoria)
 Poecilipta zbigniewi Raven, 2015 — Australia (Tasmania)

Pranburia

Pranburia Deeleman-Reinhold, 1993
 Pranburia mahannopi Deeleman-Reinhold, 1993 (type) — Thailand, Cambodia, Laos, Malaysia

Procopius

Procopius Thorell, 1899
 Procopius aeneolus Simon, 1903 — Equatorial Guinea
 Procopius aethiops Thorell, 1899 (type) — Cameroon
 Procopius affinis Lessert, 1946 — Congo
 Procopius ensifer Simon, 1910 — West Africa, Equatorial Guinea (Bioko)
 Procopius gentilis Simon, 1910 — West Africa
 Procopius granulosus Simon, 1903 — Equatorial Guinea (Bioko, Mbini), Cameroon
 Procopius granulosus helluo Simon, 1910 — Equatorial Guinea (Bioko)
 Procopius laticeps Simon, 1910 — Equatorial Guinea (Bioko)
 Procopius lesserti (Strand, 1916) — Congo, Rwanda
 Procopius luteifemur Schmidt, 1956 — Cameroon
 Procopius vittatus Thorell, 1899 — Cameroon

Pronophaea

Pronophaea Simon, 1897
 Pronophaea natalica Simon, 1897 (type) — South Africa
 Pronophaea proxima (Lessert, 1923) — South Africa
 Pronophaea vidua (Lessert, 1923) — South Africa

Psellocoptus

Psellocoptus Simon, 1896
 Psellocoptus buchlii Reiskind, 1971 — Venezuela
 Psellocoptus flavostriatus Simon, 1896 (type) — Venezuela
 Psellocoptus prodontus Reiskind, 1971 — Venezuela

Pseudocorinna

Pseudocorinna Simon, 1910
 Pseudocorinna alligator Jocqué & Bosselaers, 2011 — Guinea, Liberia, Ivory Coast
 Pseudocorinna amicorum Jocqué & Bosselaers, 2011 — Cameroon
 Pseudocorinna amphibia Jocqué & Bosselaers, 2011 — Ivory Coast
 Pseudocorinna banco Jocqué & Bosselaers, 2011 — Guinea, Ivory Coast
 Pseudocorinna bilobata Jocqué & Bosselaers, 2011 — Togo
 Pseudocorinna brianeno Jocqué & Bosselaers, 2011 — Guinea, Liberia, Ivory Coast
 Pseudocorinna celisi Jocqué & Bosselaers, 2011 — Congo
 Pseudocorinna christae Jocqué & Bosselaers, 2011 — Ivory Coast
 Pseudocorinna cymarum Jocqué & Bosselaers, 2011 — Ghana
 Pseudocorinna doutreleponti Jocqué & Bosselaers, 2011 — Cameroon
 Pseudocorinna eruca Jocqué & Bosselaers, 2011 — Congo
 Pseudocorinna evertsi Jocqué & Bosselaers, 2011 — Ivory Coast
 Pseudocorinna febe Jocqué & Bosselaers, 2011 — Cameroon
 Pseudocorinna felix Jocqué & Bosselaers, 2011 — Ivory Coast
 Pseudocorinna gevaertsi Jocqué & Bosselaers, 2011 — Congo
 Pseudocorinna incisa Jocqué & Bosselaers, 2011 — Gabon
 Pseudocorinna juakalyi Jocqué & Bosselaers, 2011 — Congo
 Pseudocorinna lanius Jocqué & Bosselaers, 2011 — Liberia, Ivory Coast
 Pseudocorinna lobelia Jocqué & Bosselaers, 2011 — Congo
 Pseudocorinna natalis Jocqué & Bosselaers, 2011 — Congo
 Pseudocorinna naufraga Jocqué & Bosselaers, 2011 — Congo
 Pseudocorinna okupe Jocqué & Bosselaers, 2011 — Cameroon
 Pseudocorinna orientalis Jocqué & Bosselaers, 2011 — Congo
 Pseudocorinna perplexa Jocqué & Bosselaers, 2011 — Nigeria
 Pseudocorinna personata Jocqué & Bosselaers, 2011 — Cameroon
 Pseudocorinna rutila Simon, 1910 (type) — Guinea-Bissau
 Pseudocorinna septemaculeata Simon, 1910 — Cameroon, Equatorial Guinea (Bioko)
 Pseudocorinna ubicki Jocqué & Bosselaers, 2011 — Equatorial Guinea (Bioko)
 Pseudocorinna victoria Jocqué & Bosselaers, 2011 — Cameroon

S

Scorteccia

Scorteccia Caporiacco, 1936
 Scorteccia termitarum Caporiacco, 1936 (type) — Libya

Septentrinna

Septentrinna Bonaldo, 2000
 Septentrinna bicalcarata (Simon, 1896) (type) — USA, Mexico
 Septentrinna paradoxa (F. O. Pickard-Cambridge, 1899) — Guatemala
 Septentrinna potosi Bonaldo, 2000 — Mexico
 Septentrinna retusa (F. O. Pickard-Cambridge, 1899) — Guatemala
 Septentrinna steckleri (Gertsch, 1936) — USA, Mexico
 Septentrinna yucatan Bonaldo, 2000 — Mexico

Serendib

Serendib Deeleman-Reinhold, 2001
 Serendib muadai Jäger, Nophaseud & Praxaysombath, 2012 — Laos
 Serendib suthepica Deeleman-Reinhold, 2001 — Thailand, Indonesia (Bali)
 Serendib volans Deeleman-Reinhold, 2001 (type) — Thailand, Indonesia (Borneo)

Simonestus

Simonestus Bonaldo, 2000
 Simonestus occidentalis (Schenkel, 1953) — Venezuela
 Simonestus pseudobulbulus (Caporiacco, 1938) — Guatemala
 Simonestus robustus (Chickering, 1937) — Panama
 Simonestus semiluna (F. O. Pickard-Cambridge, 1899) — Mexico, Guatemala
 Simonestus separatus (Schmidt, 1971) — Guatemala to Peru
 Simonestus validus (Simon, 1898) (type) — Venezuela

Sphecotypus

Sphecotypus O. Pickard-Cambridge, 1895
 Sphecotypus birmanicus (Thorell, 1897) — Myanmar
 Sphecotypus borneensis Yamasaki, 2017 — Malaysia (Borneo)
 Sphecotypus niger (Perty, 1833) (type) — Nicaragua to Brazil
 Sphecotypus taprobanicus Simon, 1897 — Sri Lanka

Stethorrhagus

Stethorrhagus Simon, 1896
 Stethorrhagus archangelus Bonaldo & Brescovit, 1994 — Brazil
 Stethorrhagus chalybeius (L. Koch, 1866) — Colombia
 Stethorrhagus duidae Gertsch, 1942 — Venezuela
 Stethorrhagus hyula Bonaldo & Brescovit, 1994 — Colombia
 Stethorrhagus latoma Bonaldo & Brescovit, 1994 — Venezuela
 Stethorrhagus limbatus Simon, 1896 (type) — Brazil, Guyana
 Stethorrhagus lupulus Simon, 1896 — Colombia, Venezuela, Peru, Brazil
 Stethorrhagus maculatus (L. Koch, 1866) — Colombia
 Stethorrhagus nigrinus (Berland, 1913) — Ecuador
 Stethorrhagus oxossi Bonaldo & Brescovit, 1994 — Brazil
 Stethorrhagus peckorum Bonaldo & Brescovit, 1994 — Venezuela
 Stethorrhagus penai Bonaldo & Brescovit, 1994 — Ecuador
 Stethorrhagus planada Bonaldo & Brescovit, 1994 — Colombia
 Stethorrhagus roraimae Gertsch, 1942 — Brazil
 Stethorrhagus tridentatus Caporiacco, 1955 — Venezuela

T

Tapixaua

Tapixaua Bonaldo, 2000
 Tapixaua callida Bonaldo, 2000 (type) — Brazil, Peru

Ticopa

Ticopa Raven, 2015
 Ticopa australis Raven, 2015 (type) — Australia
 Ticopa carnarvon Raven, 2015 — Australia (Western Australia)
 Ticopa chinchilla Raven, 2015 — Australia (Queensland)
 Ticopa dingo Raven, 2015 — Australia (Queensland)
 Ticopa hudsoni Raven, 2015 — Australia (Queensland, New South Wales)
 Ticopa longbottomi Raven, 2015 — Australia (Western Australia)

Tupirinna

Tupirinna Bonaldo, 2000
 Tupirinna albofasciata (Mello-Leitão, 1943) — Brazil
 Tupirinna rosae Bonaldo, 2000 (type) — Venezuela, Brazil
 Tupirinna trilineata (Chickering, 1937) — Panama

V

Vendaphaea

Vendaphaea Haddad, 2009
 Vendaphaea lajuma Haddad, 2009 (type) — South Africa

W

Wasaka

Wasaka Haddad, 2013
 Wasaka imitatrix Haddad, 2013 — Tanzania
 Wasaka montana Haddad, 2013 — Burundi, Rwanda, Uganda
 Wasaka occulta Haddad, 2013 (type) — Tanzania
 Wasaka ventralis Haddad, 2013 — Cameroon

X

Xeropigo

Xeropigo O. Pickard-Cambridge, 1882
 Xeropigo aitatu Carvalho, Shimano, Candiani & Bonaldo, 2016 — Brazil
 Xeropigo brescoviti De Souza & Bonaldo, 2007 — Bolivia
 Xeropigo cajuina Carvalho, Shimano, Candiani & Bonaldo, 2016 — Brazil
 Xeropigo camilae De Souza & Bonaldo, 2007 — Brazil
 Xeropigo candango De Souza & Bonaldo, 2007 — Brazil
 Xeropigo canga Carvalho, Shimano, Candiani & Bonaldo, 2016 — Brazil
 Xeropigo cotijuba De Souza & Bonaldo, 2007 — Guiana, Brazil
 Xeropigo crispim Carvalho, Shimano, Candiani & Bonaldo, 2016 — Brazil
 Xeropigo oxente Carvalho, Shimano, Candiani & Bonaldo, 2016 — Brazil
 Xeropigo pachitea De Souza & Bonaldo, 2007 — Peru, Brazil
 Xeropigo perene De Souza & Bonaldo, 2007 — Peru, Brazil
 Xeropigo piripiri Carvalho, Shimano, Candiani & Bonaldo, 2016 — Brazil
 Xeropigo rheimsae De Souza & Bonaldo, 2007 — Brazil
 Xeropigo smedigari (Caporiacco, 1955) — Venezuela, Trinidad
 Xeropigo tridentiger (O. Pickard-Cambridge, 1870) (type) — USA, Caribbean to Brazil, St. Helena
 Xeropigo tridentiger reichardti (Strand, 1916) — Cayman Is. (Grand Cayman)
 Xeropigo ufo Carvalho, Shimano, Candiani & Bonaldo, 2016 — Brazil

References

Corinnidae
Corinnidae